Mark L. Grover (born 1947) is an expert on Mormonism in Brazil and an author on religion in Latin America.

Biography
Grover was born in Malad, Idaho and is a member of the Church of Jesus Christ of Latter-day Saints (LDS Church).  He served as a Mormon missionary in Brazil.  He has a Ph.D. in Brazilian History from Indiana University.  

Grover works as the subject area librarian for Latin America at the Harold B. Lee Library at Brigham Young University.

Writings
Grover is the author of several books related to the LDS Church and Brazil and at times focusing more broadly on Latin America and religion in general.  He has compiled multiple bibliographies related to the LDS Church in Latin America and Mexican-Americans in Utah.

Books

Articles

Other

Notes

Sources
Dustjacket bio connected with autobiography of Elder Helvécio Martins
blog entry by Holzapfel about Grover's book

External links 
 
 

1947 births
20th-century Mormon missionaries
American Latter Day Saint writers
American Mormon missionaries in Brazil
Brigham Young University staff
The Church of Jesus Christ of Latter-day Saints in Brazil
Historians of Latin America
Historians of the Latter Day Saint movement
Living people
People from Malad City, Idaho
Missing middle or first names
Latter Day Saints from Idaho
Latter Day Saints from Indiana
Latter Day Saints from Utah